Long Range Mountains is a federal electoral district in the Canadian province of Newfoundland and Labrador.  It covers the entirety the west coast of the island of Newfoundland.

Long Range Mountains was created by the 2012 federal electoral boundaries redistribution and was legally defined in the 2013 representation order. It came into effect upon the call of the 42nd Canadian federal election, which took place in October 2015. It was created out of the electoral districts of Humber—St. Barbe—Baie Verte (65%) and Random—Burin—St. George's (35%).

Geography
The riding covers the west coast of the island of Newfoundland, from Channel-Port aux Basques and Burgeo in the south, to St. Anthony and L'Anse aux Meadows in the north.  The largest community in the riding is the city of Corner Brook.  It also includes Gros Morne National Park.

Boundary description
The official description of the electoral district, as offered by Elections Canada, states that it is "All that area consisting of that part of the Island of Newfoundland lying westerly and southerly of a line described as follows: commencing at the mouth of Chaleur Bay; thence generally northwesterly along said bay to the end of said bay; thence westerly in a straight line to the most southerly point of Dry Pond at approximate latitude 47°50'25"N and approximate longitude 57°31'17"W; thence northerly in a straight line to the mouth of Lloyds River at the westernmost extremity of Red Indian Lake; thence northerly in a straight line to a point in Hinds Lake at latitude 48°57'49"N and longitude 56°59'36"W; thence northerly in a straight line to the southeasternmost point of the limit of the Town of Hampden; thence generally northerly along the easterly limit of said town to the northeasternmost point of the limit of said town; thence easterly in a straight line to a point in White Bay at latitude 49°34'31"N and longitude 56°50'24"W; thence generally northerly along said bay to the Atlantic Ocean.

Including Ramea Islands, Sops Island, Bell Island, Groais Island of the Grey Islands, Quirpon Island, St. John Island and all other islands adjacent to the shoreline of the above-described area."

Demographics
According to the Canada 2011 Census; 2013 representation

Ethnic groups: 82.4% White, 17.1% Aboriginal 
Languages: 98.7% English
Religions: 95.4% Christian (36.7% Anglican, 34.4% Catholic, 10.5% United Church, 6.5% Pentecostal, 7.3% Other), 4.4% No religion 
Median income (2010): $22,576 
Average income (2010): $30,470

History
The riding of Long Range Mountains was created in 2013 from the electoral districts of Humber—St. Barbe—Baie Verte and Random—Burin—St. George's.

Election results

2021 general election

2019 general election

2015 general election

Student vote results

2019

2015

References 

Newfoundland and Labrador federal electoral districts
Corner Brook
Stephenville, Newfoundland and Labrador